Wilbur Carl Sze (January 19, 1915 – December 15, 2009) was the first Chinese-American to be commissioned as an officer in the United States Marine Corps.

Early life and education

Wilbur Sze was born on January 15, 1915, in Washington D.C. He was the son of Dr. Phillip Sze, a Chinese medical practitioner. His uncle was Alfred Sao-ke Sze, a prominent Chinese diplomat in the U.S. in the 1920s and 1930s. From 1920 to 1931 Wilbur lived in Shanghai, Republic of China. Upon returning to the United States, where he did not read, write, or speak English,  he was enrolled in the Staunton Military Academy in Staunton, Virginia. In 1934, he transferred to Central High School in Washington D.C. and later graduated in 1936. He next attended George Washington University where he studied electrical engineering. In 1937, the Empire of Japan invaded China which cut off the money he was receiving to attend school. Undeterred, he began working and attending classes at night. After eight years, he was able to attain his electrical engineering degree, graduating February 22, 1944.

Marine Corps Service
On December 15, 1943, 2nd Lieutenant Wilbur Carl Sze became the first Chinese-American officer commissioned in the Marine Corps.  In early August 1944, Lt Sze accompanied LtGen Robert Khe-Shang-Lim, Chief of the Supervising and Planning Committee of the Republic of China Army, on a tour of Marine Corps Base Camp LeJeune, North Carolina.

Following the war, 1stLt Sze served as the aide-de-camp for MajGen Keller E. Rockey, then Commanding General of the III Amphibious Corps while in Tientsin, China.

Personal life
Sze was married to Mariana Yung-Kwa, the daughter of the former Chinese Consul in Washington D.C.

See also
Kurt Chew-Een Lee
Military history of Asian Americans
Chinese-American service in World War II
Desegregation in the United States Marine Corps

Notes

1915 births
2009 deaths
United States Marine Corps officers
Chinese-American history
American military personnel of Chinese descent
United States Marine Corps personnel of World War II